Dimiter Angelov (Димитър Ангелов 1904-1977) was a Bulgarian writer best known for the novel Life or Death („На живот и смърт"), which was made into a Bulgarian film in 1974.

References

1904 births
1977 deaths